Glyphostoma bayeri, common name the Bayer's turrid, is a species of sea snail, a marine gastropod mollusk in the family Clathurellidae.

Description
The size of an adult shell varies between 15 mm and 33 mm.

Distribution
This marine species occurs in the Gulf of Panama.

References

External links
 

bayeri
Gastropods described in 1971